Zoriah Miller (born January 27, 1976), or simply Zoriah, is an American photojournalist and war photographer. He has worked for international aid organizations such as the Red Cross before returning to photography after a long absence. Although having contributed photos to photo agencies World Picture News, The Image Works, Reporters Agency, and Rapport Press, Miller remains independent and produces his photo stories on a freelance basis.

Miller's images of conflict in Iraq have been published in relation to a controversy where he was kicked out of embed with US forces when he was accused of violating the terms of his embedding by taking pictures of dead and injured soldiers and thereby "[providing the] enemy with an after-action report on the effectiveness of their attack and on the response procedures of U.S. and Iraqi forces". Photographs that he took in Iraq of dead US Marines after a suicide bomber in Al-Karmah that he posted on his website were widely discussed and brought to light the issue of wartime censorship.

Awards, honors and achievements
Although working as a photographer from a young age , Miller's career did not take off until late 2005 when a photograph of his showing one result of the 2004 Indian Ocean tsunami was published by Newsweek.

Miller was named Photojournalist Of The Year by the Morepraxis Organization in 2006 primarily for his work documenting the conflict in Gaza.

In January 2010, Miller won the PhotoPhilanthropy Activist Award for his work on famine in Africa.

Photography
Miller says he specializes in documenting humanitarian crises

In a one-hour television program, as part of the In Harm's Way series about different dangerous professions produced by Warner Brothers. Miller explains in the Gaza Strip in 2008, what has motivated him to become a war photographer and to take photographs in disaster areas.

In March 2010, Miller conducted a photography workshop in Haiti during a humanitarian crisis. There was controversy over the event on forums such as Lightstalkers.org.
http://zoriah.com/workshops

Notes

External links
Zoriah.com - Miller's primary website
National Public Radio story about Journalists and Fixers
Alumni Interview of Miller 2006

Video
Miller interview on Democracy Now! program, July 14, 2008

Audio
PhotoNetCast Interview" interview with Miller on the radio program PhotoNetCast

1976 births
Living people
American photojournalists
War photographers
Stock photographers